The Agonies of Agnes is a 1918 silent film adventure drama directed by Marie Dressler and starring Marie Dressler.

Plot

Cast
 Marie Dressler

References

External links
 
 The Agonies-of-Agnes

1917 films
American silent short films
American black-and-white films
Films directed by Marie Dressler
American adventure drama films
1910s adventure drama films
1917 drama films
1910s American films
Silent American drama films
Silent adventure drama films
1910s English-language films